Brett Harrison (born May 11, 1988) is an American business executive, entrepreneur, and software developer. He is the founder and CEO of the digital asset technology company Architect. He was President of the US affiliate of FTX.

Early life 
Harrison was born in New York City and raised in Dix Hills, New York. He graduated from Half Hollow Hills High School West in 2006. While in high school, his mathematical research was published in the journal American Mathematical Monthly.

He attended Harvard University, where he earned an M.S. and B.A. in computer science. He completed Math 55 during his time at Harvard.

Career 
Harrison joined Jane Street Capital as an ADR trader in 2010. He later went on to lead Jane Street’s algorithmic trading system development groups. While at Jane Street, he met and worked with Sam Bankman-Fried.

Harrison was subsequently a technology executive at Citadel Securities. At Citadel he managed the company’s Options, ETF, ADR and OTC technology departments.

In May 2021, Harrison became President of FTX US. While at FTX US Harrison established the company’s regulated business operations and opened its headquarters in Chicago. In 2022 he built and managed the launch of the company’s US retail stock brokerage and trading platform.

In August 2022, FTX US and four other companies received a cease and desist letter from the FDIC instructing the companies to correct potentially false or misleading statements about products’ eligibility for insurance protection. A tweet by Harrison was included in the letter. Harrison deleted the tweet and stated he did not intend to mislead anyone.

On September 27th, 2022, Harrison announced his resignation from FTX US. His resignation was reported as abrupt. Harrison later stated that he resigned after repeated disputes over management practices with Sam Bankman-Fried. He denied that he had knowledge of the alleged criminal conduct that led to FTX’s bankruptcy, and has not been accused of wrongdoing.

In December 2022, Bloomberg reported that Harrison was raising capital for a new trading technology venture. In January 2023, Harrison closed a $5 million seed round and founded Architect, a company to develop institutional-grade trading infrastructure for cryptocurrency markets. Architect’s investors include Coinbase, Circle, and Anthony Scaramucci.

Personal Life 
Harrison is Jewish. He is vegan and owns numerous rescue dogs and cats.

He is married to Hannah Harrison. In January 2019, they adopted a child with congenital amputations from China.

References

Harvard College alumni

1988 births
Living people
American businesspeople
American software engineers
American technology executives
21st-century American Jews